Qarah Qeshlaq or Qareh Qeshlaq, also rendered as Qara Qishlaq, may refer to various places in Iran:
 Qarah Qeshlaq, Germi, Ardabil Province
 Qarah Qeshlaq, Kowsar, Ardabil Province
 Qarah Qeshlaq, Qeshlaq, East Azerbaijan Province
 Qarah Qeshlaq, Vargahan, East Azerbaijan Province
 Qareh Qeshlaq, Bonab, East Azerbaijan Province
 Qarah Qeshlaq, Mahabad, West Azerbaijan Province
 Qarah Qeshlaq, Salmas, West Azerbaijan Province
 Qarah Qeshlaq, Zanjan